"Never Sleep" is a song by Canadian rapper Nav and American rapper Lil Baby featuring fellow American rapper Travis Scott, released on July 29, 2022 as the lead single on the former's fourth studio album, Demons Protected by Angels. The song was written by the artists alongside producers Tay Keith, Grayson, and Mike Dean.

Background
In an interview with Complex, Nav stated that he began as a producer and engineer when composing the song, and that it was recorded two months before it was released. In that interview, he also revealed that he was so focused on mixing the album Demons Protected by Angels that he forgot to announce the song, until his assistant angrily reminded him. Nav teased the song on July 25, 2022, before releasing it on July 29.

Composition
The song finds the three rappers describing their increasing income and rich lifestyles, using "colorful" metaphors that highlight them.

Music video
The official music video was released on September 13, 2022, along with the music video of Nav and Don Toliver's song "One Time". Directed by Evan Larsen, it finds the three artists in a Las Vegas casino. While performing his portion, Travis Scott appears on the backs of pennies from a slot machine, on a jumbotron and playing cards. Nav becomes small in size and raps atop a card table with poker chips scattered around him, while Lil Baby, also shrunk down in size, raps on top of a stack of chips. The clip also features a cameo from Canadian singer The Weeknd, who is seen laughing with Nav as they play blackjack.

Charts

Certifications

References

2022 singles
2022 songs
Nav (rapper) songs
Lil Baby songs
Travis Scott songs
Song recordings produced by Tay Keith
Song recordings produced by Mike Dean (record producer)
Songs written by Nav (rapper)
Songs written by Lil Baby
Songs written by Travis Scott
Songs written by Tay Keith
Songs written by Mike Dean (record producer)
Republic Records singles